Malpolon is a genus of snakes, containing the following species:
Malpolon insignitus (Geoffroy Saint-Hilaire, 1827) – eastern Montpellier snake
Malpolon moilensis (Reuss, 1834) – False cobra
Malpolon monspessulanus (Hermann, 1804) – Montpellier snake

References

External links

Psammophiidae
Snakes of Africa
Reptiles of Europe
Snake genera
Taxa named by Leopold Fitzinger